The Mount Adams Fire Observation Station is a historic fire observation station located on Mount Adams at Newcomb in Essex County, New York. The tower is a prefabricated structure built by the Aermotor Corporation to provide a front line of defense in preserving the Adirondack Park from the hazards of forest fires.

It was added to the National Register of Historic Places in 2006.

References

External links
The Fire Towers of New York

Government buildings completed in 1917
Towers completed in 1917
Government buildings on the National Register of Historic Places in New York (state)
Buildings and structures in Essex County, New York
Fire lookout towers in Adirondack Park
Fire lookout towers on the National Register of Historic Places in New York (state)
National Register of Historic Places in Essex County, New York